Big Thunder may refer to
 Big Thunder National Training Center, a Nordic skiing center in Thunder Bay, Ontario, Canada
 Big Thunder Ski Jumping Center, a ski jumping hill
 Big Sky Thunder, a professional indoor football  team
 Big Thunder Mountain Railroad, a ride in several Disney theme parks
 Big Thunder Ranch, an attraction in Disneyland